Vlahović is a surname, a patronymic of Vlaho. It may refer to:

Arts and entertainment
Helga Vlahović (born 1945), Croatian journalist, producer, and television personality
Jugoslav Vlahović (born 1949), Montenegrin artist and illustrator
Tyler Vlahovich (born 1967), American artist

Football
Dušan Vlahović (born 2000), Serbian footballer
Neđeljko Vlahović (born 1984), Montenegrin footballer

Politics
Miodrag Vlahović (politician) (born 1961), Montenegrin politician
Veljko Vlahović (1914–1975), Montenegrin politician and army officer
Miodrag Vlahović (born 1930), President of the Presidency of the Socialist Republic of Montenegro 1984–85

See also
 Vlaović

Croatian surnames
Serbian surnames